The Mexican Records in Swimming are the fastest times ever swum by a swimmer from Mexico. These records are kept/maintained by Mexico's national swimming federation: la Federación Mexicana de Natación (FMN). FMN recognizes records in both long course (50m) and short course (25m) pools, in the following events:
freestyle (libre): 50, 100, 200, 400, 800 and 1500;
backstroke (dorso): 50, 100 and 200;
breaststroke (pecho): 50, 100 and 200;
butterfly (mariposa): 50, 100 and 200;
individual medley (I.M.) (combinado, C.I.): 200 and 400;
relays (relevos): 200 free, 400 free, 800 free, and 400 medley.

Long course (50 m)

Men

,
|-bgcolor=#DDDDDD
|colspan=9|
|-

|-bgcolor=#DDDDDD
|colspan=9|
|-

|-bgcolor=#DDDDDD
|colspan=9|
|-

|-bgcolor=#DDDDDD
|colspan=9|
|-

|-bgcolor=#DDDDDD
|colspan=9|
|-

Women

|-bgcolor=#DDDDDD
|colspan=9|
|-

|-bgcolor=#DDDDDD
|colspan=9|
|-

|-bgcolor=#DDDDDD
|colspan=9|
|-

|-bgcolor=#DDDDDD
|colspan=9|
|-

|-bgcolor=#DDDDDD
|colspan=9|
|-

Mixed relay

Short course (25 m)

Men

|-bgcolor=#DDDDDD
|colspan=9|
|-

|-bgcolor=#DDDDDD
|colspan=9|
|-

|-bgcolor=#DDDDDD
|colspan=9|
|-

|-bgcolor=#DDDDDD
|colspan=9|
|-

|-bgcolor=#DDDDDD
|colspan=9|
|-

Women

|-bgcolor=#DDDDDD
|colspan=9|
|-

|-bgcolor=#DDDDDD
|colspan=9|
|-

|-bgcolor=#DDDDDD
|colspan=9|
|-

|-bgcolor=#DDDDDD
|colspan=9|
|-

|-bgcolor=#DDDDDD
|colspan=9|
|-

Mixed relay

Notes

References
General
 Mexican Records 30 September 2022 updated
Specific

External links
 FMN web site
 FMN records page

Mexican
Records
Swimming
Swimming